Russell Springs is a city in Logan County, Kansas, United States.  As of the 2020 census, the population of the city was 26.

History
Russell Springs, founded in 1865, was the Eaton stop on the Butterfield Overland Dispatch stage line. The line ran through rough Indian country to connect the gold mines in Denver, Colorado, with Fort Riley, Kansas.  It ran until the Kansas Pacific Railroad was built.  Travelers on the Butterfield Trail always made the natural springs in the area a watering place and calling them "Russell's Springs".

It was named for Avra P. Russell, of the 2nd Regiment Kansas Volunteer Cavalry.

Russell Springs was the county seat of Logan County until 1963.  There was much feuding over which town should serve as county seat, and Oakley won the honor in 1963.  In 1965, the old county courthouse in Russell Springs became the Butterfield Trail Museum.

Geography
Russell Springs is located at  (38.911215, -101.175917).

Climate
According to the Köppen Climate Classification system, Russell Springs has a semi-arid climate, abbreviated "BSk" on climate maps.

Demographics

2010 census
As of the 2010 census, there were 24 people, 13 households, and 8 families residing in the city. The racial makeup of the city was 100.0% White. Hispanics and Latinos of any race were 0.0% of the population.

There were 13 households, of which 15.4% had children under the age of 18 living with them, 53.8% were married couples living together, 0.0% had a male householder with no wife present, 7.7% had a female householder with no husband present, and 38.5% were non-families. 38.5% of all households were made up of individuals, and 30.8% had someone living alone who was 65 years of age or older. The average household size was 1.85, and the average family size was 2.38.

In the city, the population was spread out, with 12.5% under the age of 18, 4.2% from 18 to 24, 25.0% from 25 to 44, 20.8% from 45 to 64, and 37.5% who were 65 years of age or older. The median age was 53.5 years. For every 100 females, there were 140.0 males. For every 100 females age 18 and over, there were 110.0 males.

The median income for a household in the city was $38,750, and the median income for a family was $44,375. Males had a median income of $33,125 versus $0 for females. The per capita income for the city was $17,370. None of the population and none of the families were below the poverty line.

Government
Russell Springs is a city of the third class with a mayor-council form of government. The city council consists of five members and meets on the third Wednesday of each month.

Russell Springs lies within Kansas's 1st U.S. Congressional District. For the purposes of representation in the Kansas Legislature, the city is located in the 40th district of the Kansas Senate and the 118th district of the Kansas House of Representatives.

Education
Russell Springs is a part of Triplains USD 275.

Russell Springs schools were closed through school unification. The Russell Springs High School mascot was Russell Springs Hornets.

Transportation
Kansas Highway 25 (K-25) runs north-south through Russell Springs.

Culture

Points of interest
 Butterfield Trail Historical Museum

References

Further reading

 The 1880s Logan County Nickel Mine Hoax; John M. Peterson; Kansas History: A Journal of the Central Plains; 8 pages; Vol 2, No 1, Spring 1979.

External links

 Russell Springs - Directory of Public Officials
 Russell Springs City Map, KDOT

Cities in Kansas
Cities in Logan County, Kansas
Populated places established in 1865
1865 establishments in Kansas